The Etudes Andre Morin M85, or variously M 85 and M-85, is a French amateur-built aircraft that was designed by André Morin of Colombes. The aircraft is supplied in the form of plans for amateur construction.

Design and development
The M85 features a strut-braced high-wing, a two-seats-in-side-by-side configuration enclosed cockpit accessed by doors, fixed tricycle landing gear and a single engine in tractor configuration.

The aircraft is made with a welded steel tubing fuselage. The wings can be constructed with either an aluminum sheet or wooden structure, with its flying surfaces covered in doped aircraft fabric in both cases. The wooden wings include leading edge slots. The standard engine recommended is the  Rotax 912UL four-stroke powerplant. The World Directory of Leisure Aviation 2011-12 states that landing gear uses sprung aluminium suspension for all three wheels and that the nose wheel is freely castering and steering is accomplished with differential braking. Later models have sprung aluminium suspension for the main wheels and a rudder pedal-controlled steerable nose wheel.

Specifications (M85)

References

External links

Homebuilt aircraft
Single-engined tractor aircraft